The 1999 NCAA Division I Outdoor Track and Field Championships were held June 2−5 at Bronco Stadium at Boise State University in Boise, Idaho. It determined the individual and team national champions of men's and women's collegiate Division I outdoor track and field events in the United States.

These were the 77th annual men's championships and the 18th annual women's championships. Favored  Arkansas topped the men's team standings for an eighth consecutive year, and Texas finished atop the women's team standings.

Boise had previously hosted five years earlier; with a final day attendance of 8,455 on Saturday, the four-day total in 1999 was 26,596.

Team results 
 Note: Top 10 only
 Full results

Men's standings

Women's standings

Men's events

100 meters
Final results shown, not prelims

200 meters
Final results shown, not prelims

400 meters
Final results shown, not prelims

800 meters
Final results shown, not prelims

1500 meters
Final results shown, not prelims

3000 meters steeplechase
Final results shown, not prelims

5000 meters
Final results shown, not prelims

10,000 meters
Final results shown, not prelims

110 meters hurdles
Final results shown, not prelims

400 meters hurdles

4x100-meter relay
Final results shown, not prelims

4x400-meter relay
Final results shown, not prelims

High Jump
Only top eight final results shown; no prelims are listed

Pole Vault
Only top eight final results shown; no prelims are listed

All other finalists; No Height

Long Jump
Only top eight final results shown; no prelims are listed

Triple Jump
Only top eight final results shown; no prelims are listed

Shot Put
Only top eight final results shown; no prelims are listed

Discus
Only top eight final results shown; no prelims are listed

Hammer Throw
Only top eight final results shown; no prelims are listed

Javelin Throw
Only top eight final results shown; no prelims are listed

Decathlon

Women's events

100 meters
Final results shown, not prelims

200 meters
Final results shown, not prelims

400 meters
Final results shown, not prelims

800 meters
Final results shown, not prelims

1500 meters
Final results shown, not prelims

3000 meters
Final results shown, not prelims

5000 meters
Final results shown, not prelims

10,000 meters
Final results shown, no prelims

100 meters hurdles
Final results shown, not prelims

400 meters hurdles

4x100-meter relay
Final results shown, not prelims

4x400-meter relay
Final results shown, not prelims

High Jump
Only top eight final results shown; no prelims are listed

Pole Vault
Only top eight final results shown; no prelims are listed

Long Jump
Only top eight final results shown; no prelims are listed

Triple Jump
Only top eight final results shown; no prelims are listed

Shot Put
Only top eight final results shown; no prelims are listed

Discus
Only top eight final results shown; no prelims are listed

Hammer Throw
Only top eight final results shown; no prelims are listed

Javelin Throw
Only top eight final results shown; no prelims are listed

Heptathlon

References

NCAA Men's Outdoor Track and Field Championship
NCAA Division I Outdoor Track And Field Championships
NCAA Division I Outdoor Track And Field Championships
NCAA Division I Outdoor Track and Field Championships
NCAA Women's Outdoor Track and Field Championship